Eduard Reizvikh (born March 30, 1991, in Omsk) is a Russian professional ice hockey goaltender. He is currently playing with Avangard Omsk of the Kontinental Hockey League (KHL).

Reizvikh made his Kontinental Hockey League debut playing with Avangard Omsk during the 2009–10 KHL season.

References

External links
 

1991 births
Living people
Avangard Omsk players
Russian ice hockey goaltenders
Sportspeople from Omsk